Carrolls is an unincorporated community in Cowlitz County, Washington, south of the city of Kelso. Carrolls is located south on Old Pacific Highway from exit 36 of Interstate 5. The Carrolls community is part of the Kelso School District, a K-12 school district of nearly 5,000 students.

The community derives its name from Major Carroll, a pioneer resident.

Geography
Carrolls is located at  (46.0715022, -122.8623306).

External links
Kelso School District website

References

Unincorporated communities in Cowlitz County, Washington
Unincorporated communities in Washington (state)